George A. McManus Jr. (born December 12, 1930) is a former Republican member of the Michigan Senate, serving from 1991 to 2002.

The salutatorian of his high school class in 1948, McManus went on to receive both a bachelor's and a master's degree from Michigan State University. He later served as the extension director for the institution in Grand Traverse County for 25 years. McManus is a fourth-generation cherry farmer.

McManus was a trustee of Northwestern Michigan College for 20 years, and a director of the college's foundation. He also served on the Grand Traverse Area Catholic Board of Education.

During his time in the Senate, McManus sponsored the Michigan Groundwater and Freshwater Protection Act and played a key role in protecting family farms from property tax increases.

McManus received an honorary doctorate of agriculture from Michigan State University in May 2003.

References

1930 births
Living people
People from Grand Traverse County, Michigan
Michigan State University alumni
Republican Party Michigan state senators
Farmers from Michigan
20th-century American politicians
21st-century American politicians